Kataja Basket Club is a professional basketball club of sports club Kataja from Joensuu, Finland. The team plays in the Korisliiga, the highest tier of Finnish basketball. In 2015, Kataja won its first national championship, after it beat Bisons Loimaa 3–2 in the Finnish Finals.

History
The basketball activity of the club started in 1955. In 1961, the team started playing in the Joensuu Sports Hall. The team started in provincial competitions, but quickly promoted to the national level in the 1960s. From 1976 till 1980, the team played continuously in the highest Finnish division. In the 2001–02 season, the team won its first trophy when it won the Finnish Cup. In 2015, the first championship of Kataja was realized after a 3–2 Finals series win against Bisons Loimaa. In the 2012–13 season, Kataja started participating in European competitions when it entered the EuroChallenge. The team immediately reached the quarterfinals of the competition, and has played in Europe every season since.

Achievements
 Korisliiga
Champions (2): 2014–15, 2016–17
 Finnish Cup 
Champions (4): 2002, 2011, 2012, 2023

Players

Retired numbers

Current roster

Notable players
- Set a club record or won an individual award as a professional player.
- Played at least one official international match for his senior national team at any time.

Season by season

References

External links
 Official site 

Basketball teams in Finland
Joensuu
1949 establishments in Finland